A Different Kind of Fix is the third studio album by the British indie rock band Bombay Bicycle Club. It was released on 26 August 2011 by Island Records in the United Kingdom and 17 January 2012 on A&M/Octone Records in the United States.

Singles
 "Shuffle" was the first single released from the album, on 23 June 2011. It peaked at number 69 on the UK Singles Chart.
 "Lights Out, Words Gone" was the second single, released on 14 October 2011.
 "Leave It" was the third single, released on 2 January 2012.
 "How Can You Swallow So Much Sleep" was the fourth single, released on 5 March 2012. Directed by Anna Ginsburg, the video for "How Can You Swallow So Much Sleep" is an 'epic' journey of a little boy who one night dreams of going to the moon. The video was inspired by a story in the Cosmicomics by Italo Calvino.
 The non-album single "Beg" was released on 9 July 2012.

Track listing

Personnel
Jack Steadman - lead vocals, guitar, piano
Jamie MacColl - guitar
Ed Nash - bass guitar
Suren de Saram - drums
Lucy Rose - backing vocals

Chart performance

Weekly charts

Year-end charts

As of January 2012, UK sales stand at 80,000 copies, according to The Guardian.

Release history

References

2011 albums
Bombay Bicycle Club albums
A&M Octone Records albums
Island Records albums
Albums produced by Jim Abbiss